Jasmine Cephas Jones (born July 21, 1989) is an American-British actress, singer, and producer who originated the dual roles of Peggy Schuyler and Maria Reynolds in the Broadway stage musical Hamilton. In 2020, Cephas Jones won a Primetime Emmy for portraying Tyisha in #freerayshawn.

Early life 
Jones is the daughter of actor Ron Cephas Jones and British-born rock and roll singer Kim Lesley. She attended Fiorello H. LaGuardia High School of Music & Art and Performing Arts, and Berklee College of Music, and graduated from Neighborhood Playhouse School of the Theatre in 2011. Jones was born in London, England but grew up in Midwood, Brooklyn, where she still lived as of 2015.

Career 
Jones has made small appearances in multiple independent films, including Titus (2013) and Fairfield (2014). She has also appeared in episodes of Blue Bloods, Unforgettable, and Mrs. Fletcher.

In 2015, she originated the roles of Maria Reynolds and Peggy Schuyler in the original Off-Broadway production of Hamilton. When the show moved to Broadway, she continued in those roles, and remained with that production until December 8, 2016. In 2016, she won a Grammy Award for her work as one of the principal soloists on the Hamilton cast album. She has solos in 'Schuyler Sisters' and 'Say No To This'.

At Super Bowl LI, she, along with Hamilton castmates Renée Elise Goldsberry and Phillipa Soo, sang "America the Beautiful".

Jones also appears in the 2015 film Mistress America, the 2018 film Dog Days, and the critically acclaimed 2018 film Blindspotting. In 2020, she appeared as a secondary character in the short series #Freerayshawn, winning an Emmy for her performance as Tyisha. Jones' 2020 Emmy win made history both alongside her father Ron Cephas Jones for being the first father-daughter duo to win Emmy Awards in the same year, and as the first-ever Black woman to win in the Outstanding Actress in a Short Form Comedy or Drama Series category.

Following the positive response to the Blindspotting film, cable and streaming network STARZ along with Lionsgate Television, Snoot Entertainment, and Dreams With Friends Inc., ordered a spin-off series following the events of the film. The series had Jones set to lead the cast, reviving her role as Ashley for the series as it surrounds her character. The series also had Jones set to serve as producer for the season, awarding her a first producing credit. Blindspotting (TV) premiered on June 13, 2021 and was renewed for a second season by STARZ on October 14, 2021.

On July 13, 2021, Jones and her father Ron Cephas Jones announced the 2021 Primetime Emmy nominees on behalf of the Television Academy. On October 25, 2021, it was announced that Jones had signed with CAA (Creative Artists Agency) Representation.

Personal life
On December 24, 2018, Cephas Jones became engaged to fellow Hamilton original Broadway cast member Anthony Ramos, whom she met and began dating in 2014 during rehearsals for the original, Off-Broadway, production of Hamilton at The Public Theatre. It was reported that the couple split in November 2021.

Theatre

Filmography

Film

Television

Music videos

Discography

Extended plays

Singles

Guest appearances

Soundtrack and cast album appearances

Awards and nominations

References

External links 
 
 

1989 births
21st-century American actresses
Actresses from New York City
African-American actresses
American film actresses
American musical theatre actresses
American people of British descent
American stage actresses
American television actresses
Fiorello H. LaGuardia High School alumni
Grammy Award winners
Primetime Emmy Award winners
Living people
Neighborhood Playhouse School of the Theatre alumni
People from Midwood, Brooklyn
21st-century African-American women singers